Rhaphidophyton is a monotypic genus of flowering plants belonging to the family Amaranthaceae. The only species is Rhaphidophyton regelii.

Its native range is Central Asia.

References

Amaranthaceae
Amaranthaceae genera
Monotypic Caryophyllales genera
Taxa named by Alexander von Bunge